The Pfitzinger reaction (also known as the Pfitzinger-Borsche reaction) is the chemical reaction of isatin with base and a carbonyl compound to yield substituted quinoline-4-carboxylic acids.

Several reviews have been published.

Reaction mechanism

The reaction of isatin with a base such as potassium hydroxide hydrolyses the amide bond to give the keto-acid 2.  This intermediate can be isolated, but is typically not.  A ketone (or aldehyde) will react with the aniline to give the imine (3) and the enamine (4).  The enamine will cyclize and dehydrate to give the desired quinoline (5).

Variations

Halberkann variant

Reaction of N-acyl isatins with base gives 2-hydroxy-quinoline-4-carboxylic acids.

See also
Camps quinoline synthesis
Friedländer synthesis
Niementowski quinazoline synthesis
Talnetant, Cinchocaine

References

Carbon-carbon bond forming reactions
Condensation reactions
Quinoline forming reactions
Ring expansion reactions
Name reactions